Grdovići may refer to:
 Grdovići (Bar Municipality), Montenegro
 Grdovići (Arilje), Serbia